Marianne Christine McAndrew is an actress known for her role as Irene Molloy in the film Hello, Dolly!

Career
Hello, Dolly! was McAndrew's first credited film role. The role of Irene Molloy was given considerably more attention in the film than in earlier Broadway productions. Hello, Dolly! earned McAndrew two Golden Globe nominations in 1969; Golden Globe Award for Best Supporting Actress – Motion Picture and the since discontinued Golden Globe Award for New Star of the Year – Actress, as well as generally good reviews. She landed a starring (second billed) role in her next film (The Seven Minutes). By 1971, she had made appearances in popular TV shows including Hawaii 5-0, Mannix, Cannon and Love, American Style

One notable later film role was her co-starring role in The Bat People, with her husband Stewart Moss. The film was widely panned, but is still somewhat known today as a "bad film". The Bat People was also her last film released in theaters; she has only worked in television since its release. Her only other later role of particular note is her role of Doris Williams in Growing Up Brady, a TV film about the popular show. McAndrew, along with everything else related to the film Hello, Dolly! experienced something of a resurgence in popularity with the release of WALL-E, which featured clips from the film, including a duet with  McAndrew's character (but McAndrew did not do her own singing in the film, which some news outlets claimed in articles about WALL-E).

Personal life
McAndrew married actor Stewart Moss in 1968, remaining married until his death in 2017. They starred together in The Bat People. McAndrew has two brothers.

Awards and honors
Hello, Dolly! earned McAndrew two Golden Globe nominations in 1969; Golden Globe Award for Best Supporting Actress – Motion Picture and the since discontinued Golden Globe Award for New Star of the Year – Actress.

Filmography

References

External links
 
 

Living people
Actresses from Cleveland
American film actresses
American television actresses
American women singers
Singers from Ohio
21st-century American women
Year of birth missing (living people)